is a Japanese footballer who plays for FC Kariya.

Club statistics
Updated to 23 February 2017.

References

External links

Profile at Kagoshima United FC

1990 births
Living people
Kokushikan University alumni
Association football people from Osaka Prefecture
Japanese footballers
J3 League players
Japan Football League players
SP Kyoto FC players
Kagoshima United FC players
FC Kariya players
Association football goalkeepers